During the 2005–06 season, Sunderland competed in the FA Premier League.

Season Summary

A run of five consecutive losses at the start of the season was cause for concern, if not immediate alarm, seeing how the previous two seasons had similarly poor starts and ended in finishes of 3rd and 1st respectively. A three-match unbeaten run just before the international break in October saw Sunderland move out of the relegation zone and seemingly in the right direction; unfortunately, a loss to Manchester United after the season resumed dropped them right back into the bottom three, and Sunderland never left it after that point.
With the club losing every single match in-between the international break and Christmas Day, it became increasingly apparent that Sunderland were unlikely to avoid an immediate relegation. Their second win of the season didn't come until late January, and even that was against second-bottom West Bromwich Albion. Even the cups offered little respite, with the club struggling past League Two side Cheltenham Town in their first League Cup round before losing 3–0 to Arsenal in the next round, and experiencing a humiliating FA Cup exit to League One side Brentford in the fourth round.

More dismal form saw Mick McCarthy sacked after almost exactly three years as manager, and Kevin Ball was left in charge as caretaker manager for the remainder of the season, with it being clear that the most that could be hoped for was that Sunderland would at least avoid doing worse than their own record for the lowest points total in a Premier League season. Ultimately, not only did Sunderland not succeed in avoiding that dishonour, but they broke Stoke City's 21-year-old record for the fewest points under the 3 points for a win system. The only mercies that Sunderland had were that they at least avoided equalling their own record from three years prior for fewest goals scored in a top-flight season (having scored five more goals this season), and that they would only hold their new record for two years, with Derby County going on to record fewer points and fewer goals than both of Sunderland's records.

Transfers

In

Out

Players

First-team squad
Squad at end of season

Left club during season

Reserve squad

Results
Sunderland's score comes first.

League Cup

FA Cup

Premier League

Results by matchday

Friendlies

Statistics

Appearances and goals

|-
! colspan=14 style=background:#dcdcdc; text-align:center| Goalkeepers

|-
! colspan=14 style=background:#dcdcdc; text-align:center| Defenders

|-
! colspan=14 style=background:#dcdcdc; text-align:center| Midfielders

|-
! colspan=14 style=background:#dcdcdc; text-align:center| Forwards

|-
! colspan=14 style=background:#dcdcdc; text-align:center| Players transferred out during the season

|}

References

Notes

Sunderland A.F.C. seasons
Sunderland